Altwarp is a municipality located in the German state of Mecklenburg-Vorpommern, on the border with Poland. It has about 500 inhabitants and is located on the Bay of Neuwarp opposite the Polish town of Nowe Warpno.

References

Vorpommern-Greifswald